Der Protagonist (The Protagonist) is an opera in one act by Kurt Weill, his Op. 15. The German libretto was written by Georg Kaiser based on his own play of the same name of (1920). Weill's first surviving opera has been described as Literaturoper.

Performance history
It was given again at the Städtische Oper Berlin in October 1928 directed by Walter Brügmann and conducted by Robert F. Denzler, this time as a double bill with Der Zar lässt sich photographieren.

Post-war performances have included productions at the Deutsche Oper am Rhein, Düsseldorf, in April 1958 (the first German post-war performance), directed by Friedrich Wilhelm Andreas and conducted by Friedrich Brenn; Santa Fe Opera from 31 July 1993, directed by Jonathan Eaton and conducted by George Manahan (coupled with Der Zar lässt sich photographieren).

Roles

Recordings
Weill: Der Protagonist  – Berlin German Symphony Orchestra
Conductor: John Mauceri
Principal singers: Corby Welch, Matthias Koch, Alexander Marco-Buhrmester, Robert Worle, Jan Buchwald, Matteo de Monti, Johannes von Duisburg, Amanda Halgrimson
Recording date: 1 May 2002
Label: Capriccio – 60 086 (CD)

References

Further reading
Hinton, Stephen (1992), "Der Protagonist", The New Grove Dictionary of Opera, ed. Stanley Sadie (London)

External links
Work details, Kurt Weill Foundation

Operas by Kurt Weill
German-language operas
One-act operas
Operas
1926 operas
Operas based on plays